Burton A. Dole Jr. (born 1938) is Chairman of Dole/Neal, LLC, a privately held energy management firm.

Career
Dole received both a bachelor's degree in mechanical engineering and a master's degree in business administration from Stanford University after which he held several positions with Hewlett Packard (HP) including General Manager of their Medical Imaging division. He left HP in 1980 to become president, CEO, and chairman of Puritan Bennett, positions he held until 1995. He was deputy chairman and later chairman of the Federal Reserve Bank of Kansas City during the 1990s, succeeded in both offices by Herman Cain.

References

Living people
Stanford University School of Engineering alumni
Dole, Burton A. Jr.
Hewlett-Packard people

20th-century American businesspeople
Stanford Graduate School of Business alumni